Youth mainstreaming is a public policy concept. The Commonwealth of Nations describes it in this context:

It is modeled on gender mainstreaming, which the United Nations defined in the 1990s as:

Strategy
Youth mainstreaming is a two-fold strategy for pursuing youth development. Inspired by the experience of gender mainstreaming, it involves ensuring youth is reflected in policy and project stages in various sectors and ensuring there are specific projects addressing youth. Together these add up to a youth responsive approach.

By reflecting, addressing, being sensitive to, and being responsive to youth issues, mainstreaming is meant to both looking at the impact of a policy/project on young women and men, and involve young men and women in order to ensure youth participation in the decision-making of those policies and/or projects that affects them.

Advocates of youth mainstreaming point out that young people represent a disadvantaged and marginalised social group, being over-represented among the global poor and unemployed. As such it is argued that "pro-poor" strategies must be "pro-youth", and that any development intervention seeking sustainable impact must address the youth cohort.

Purposes
The purposes of youth mainstreaming include:
 Avoiding perpetuating and/or reinforcing the marginalisation of young people
 Confronting society's stigmatization of young people as deviant, criminal, incapable etc.
 Maximizing the positive impact of policies and/or projects upon young people
 Promoting inter-generational transfer of knowledge and positive cultural values
 Investing in young people: realise the benefits of engaging them as a human resource
 Respecting the right of young people to participate in decision-making (for under 18s this is enshrined in Article 12 of the UN Convention on the Rights of the Child).
 Benefiting from young people’s knowledge, skills, ideas and practical contributions
 Empowering young people, which is a Commonwealth objective under the "Plan of Action for Youth Empowerment".

Process
The basic steps in youth mainstreaming are to factor youth impacts and youth participation into all stages of a project, of whatever size and sector:
 Situation Analysis: Young women and men’s condition and position need to be researched. Young people can act as peer researchers, informants in the process.
 Planning: Young people should be a target population, and young people’s views and aspirations should be taken into account.
 Implementation of Activities: Young people should be maximally involved, consistent with their informed consent and their education, livelihoods and leisure needs.
 Monitoring and Evaluation: There should be youth-specific indicators, including those related to the quantity and quality of youth participation in the project. M&E should also involve asking young people’s view of how much progress has been made and what the challenges are.
 Budgeting: Specific line items should cover youth-specific activities and the mechanisms to be put in place to secure their participation in all stages of the project.

The steps that institutions can take toward youth mainstreaming are:
 Capacity-building on youth mainstreaming
 Designation of youth mainstreaming focal points within each department
 Integration of youth mainstreaming in planning, budgeting and Monitoring and Evaluation procedures.

Essential questions
 Are young women and men part of the target population?
 Will the situation analysis disaggregate data by age-group as well as gender, socio-economic, ethnic group etc?
 Have existing youth structures (e.g. National Youth Councils, youth NGOs and youth clubs, secondary schools, colleges) been consulted as part of background research?
 Will young people be given a role in conducting the Situation Analysis?
 Will young people’s views be canvassed and taken into account when setting goals and objectives?
 Do young people fall under the general goals and objectives?
 Are there youth-specific goals and objectives?
 What are the youth-specific line items in the budget? Will control over any of the budget be shared with/delegated to young people?
 What are the youth-specific activities likely to be?
 How is flexibility built into the project design, so that young people’s decision-making will be given expression?
 What are the youth-specific performance indicators?
 How will young people be involved in monitoring and evaluation?

See also
 Adultism
 Youth-adult partnerships
 Gender mainstreaming

References

Implementation strategies for youth mainstreaming in sustainable development processes United Nations (ECLAC).

External links 
 "Youth mainstreaming", UNESCO.

Youth rights
Ageism
Community building
International law
United Nations Economic and Social Council